Judith Bunbury is a geoarchaeologist and senior tutor at St Edmund's College, University of Cambridge, UK. Her work has characterised the movement of the river across the Nile valley over the last 10,000 years, and its impact on Egyptian civilisation.

Early life and education
Judith Bunbury is one of the daughters of Carol Irene (née Arnold) and Captain Roger Hugh Moutray Richardson-Bunbury, a naval officer. She collected rocks from childhood. She studied natural sciences at Durham University, specialising in geology and geophysics, and realised she enjoyed fieldwork. Inspired by a lecture from the Cambridge geophysicist Dan McKenzie, she asked to do a PhD with him, awarded in 1992. This was a study of basalts from Turkey.

Career
After her doctorate, she worked first at the Institute of Archaeology in Ankara in Turkey and then worked on projects from University of Cambridge, including emerald mines in Egypt. Bunbury worked on a new project at University of Cambridge in development of mass spectrometry equipment to estimate how the rocks of the Himalayas were dissolving. Her skills and experience were then applied to archaeological sites in Egypt. It was development of methods to apply geological auger boring techniques to these sites, as well as photographs from the air and satellites, that led to a new consensus that the course of the river in the Nile valley had moved very substantially over the millennia, causing profound impacts such as on the location of buildings. For example, the precise sites of buildings in the Karnak temple complex depended on where the river Nile was at the time each was built. The details of waste from human settlements and sediments retrieved in the boring core samples allowed dating and interpretation for the changing uses of the location, as sites changed between dry land and river, marsh or lakes. She works in collaboration with archaeologists to characterise the materials found in cores of sediments in sites in Egypt, especially the Nile Valley and other places of archaeological interest. 

From 2015 onwards her research focus moved address how climate change had resulted in changes in landscapes, through surveying locations in the Sahara. This led to reinterpretation of landscapes such as the Valley of the Kings as having trees, lakes and animal life 3500 years ago, rather than being sand deserts.

In 2022 she was a guest on The Life Scientific on BBC Radio 4.

Personal life
She married Canon Jonathan Collis. He was curate at St Neots, chaplain at Jesus College, Cambridge and the vicar of Thorpe Bay for twelve years until 2021. A daughter was born in 2001, and another daughter was born in 2005.

Publications
Bunbury is the author or co-author of several books and over 40 scientific publications. The books include:

 Judith Bunbury (2019) The Nile and Ancient Egypt. Changing Land- and Waterscapes, from the Neolithic to the Roman Era Cambridge University Press pp 181 

Her most significant scientific publications include:

 B. T. Pennington, J. Bunbury, and N. Hovius, (2016) Emergence of civilization, changes in fluvio-deltaic style, and nutrient redistribution forced by Holocene sea-level rise. Geoarchaeology 31 (3) 194–210.

 JK Hillier, JM Bunbury, A Graham (2007) Monuments on a migrating Nile. Journal of Archaeological Science 34 (7) 1011-1015 

 T Ahmad, N Harris, M Bickle, H Chapman, J Bunbury, C Prince (2000) Isotopic constraints on the structural relationships between the lesser Himalayan series and the high Himalayan crystalline series, Garhwal Himalaya Geological Society of America Bulletin 112 (3) 467-477

 I Shaw, J Bunbury, R Jameson (1999) Emerald mining in Roman and Byzantine Egypt. Journal of Roman Archaeology 12 203-215

References

External links
 The Life Scientific: Judith Bunbury on the shifting River Nile in the time of the Pharaohs

Living people
1967 births
British geologists
Women geologists
20th-century British geologists
20th-century British women scientists
21st-century British geologists
21st-century British women scientists
Fellows of St Edmund's College, Cambridge
Alumni of Durham University